Koombooloomba Hydro Power Station is a hydroelectric power station at Koombooloomba Dam, Queensland, Australia. The power station is owned by CleanCo.

The power station was commissioned in 1999, capturing energy from existing water releases required for the operation of Kareeya Hydro Power Station.

See also

List of power stations in Queensland

References

External links
 Clean Energy Council

Energy infrastructure completed in 1999
Hydroelectric power stations in Queensland
Buildings and structures in Far North Queensland
1999 establishments in Australia